Antonio Scotti (25 January 1866 – 26 February 1936) was an Italian baritone. He was a principal artist of the New York Metropolitan Opera for more than 33 seasons, but also sang with great success at London's Royal Opera House, Covent Garden, and Milan's La Scala.

Life
Antonio Scotti was born in Naples, Italy. His family wanted him to enter the priesthood but he embarked instead on a career in opera. He received his early vocal training from Esther Trifari-Paganini and Vincenzo Lombardi. According to most sources, he made his debut at Malta's Theatre Royal in 1889, performing the role of Amonasro in Giuseppe Verdi's Aida. Engagements at various Italian operatic venues ensued and he later gained valuable stage experience singing in Spain, Portugal, Russia and South America (Buenos Aires from 1891 to 1894 and again 1897; Río de Janeiro 1893 and Chile 1898; he also sung in Montevideo).

In 1898, he debuted at Italy's most renowned opera house, La Scala, Milan, as Hans Sachs in Die Meistersinger. This now seems a surprising choice of role for Scotti because his subsequent career did not encompass the operas of Richard Wagner.

Scotti's American debut took place in the autumn of 1899, when he sang in Chicago.

On 27 December 1899 he made his first appearance in New York City at the Metropolitan Opera, undertaking the title role in Mozart's Don Giovanni. He would become an audience favorite at the Met, earning acclaim for his graceful singing of Donizetti's bel canto music as well as for the touch of elegance that he brought to his more forceful Verdi and verismo interpretations. Scotti appeared at Covent Garden in London for the first time in 1899, singing Don Giovanni. He would return to London on many occasions prior to World War I.

At the Met in 1901, Scotti became the first artist to sing the role of Scarpia in Giacomo Puccini's Tosca in America. He appeared, too, in the American premieres of Francesco Cilea's Adriana Lecouvreur, Ermanno Wolf-Ferrari's Le donne curiose, Umberto Giordano's Fedora, Franco Leoni's L'Oracolo and Isidore de Lara's Messaline. Scotti also sang a variety of mainstream baritone parts during his time at the Met, including Rigoletto, Malatesta, Belcore, Iago, Falstaff, Marcello, and Sharpless in addition to Don Giovanni and Scarpia. He often performed opposite his close friend Enrico Caruso and appeared with the illustrious tenor when he made his Met debut as the Duke of Mantua in  Rigoletto in 1903. Scotti partnered 15 different Toscas over the course of his long career at the house.

In 1912, Scotti's arrival in the United States with Pasquale Amato and William Hinshaw for his next Met season received extensive newspaper coverage.
During this year he would also meet the restaurateur Salvatore Scoleri who would open an Italian restaurant bearing his name in Cincinnati Ohio.

He performed at the Royal Opera House, Covent Garden, on a regular basis until 1910, with additional appearances in the 1913–1914 season. During this period, he became not only London's first Scarpia but also its first Sharpless in Puccini's Madama Butterfly (in 1900 and 1905 respectively), which he also introduced to the Met in 1907. In 1917, he was elected an honorary member of Phi Mu Alpha Sinfonia, the American fraternity for male musicians, at the New England Conservatory of Music.

Scotti performed in Paris at the Opéra Comique singing Tosca (in 1904 with Emma Eames and Emilio De Marchi, conductor Cleofonte Campanini, and in 1910, with Farrar and Beyle, the young and later-prominent conductor Gino Marinuzzi). In 1910 at Theatre du Châtelet with the Metropolitan ensemble, Scotti sung Falstaff conducted by Arturo Toscanini and at the Opera, in a gala performance, the third act of La bohème with Caruso and Farrar.

In 1908, he sang at Salzburg in Don Giovanni, with Lilli Lehmann (Donna Ana), Johanna Gadski (Donna Elvira), Geraldine Farrar (Zerlina), with Karl Muck conducting.

He formed his own troupe of singers in 1919, calling it, naturally enough, the Scotti Opera Company. He managed it for several seasons while touring the United States. Scotti celebrated his 25th anniversary with the Met on 1 January 1924 in a gala performance of Tosca. By the 1930s, Scotti's voice had declined considerably but he retained his place on the Met's roster of singers due to his outstanding histrionic ability. His final Met appearance occurred on 20 January 1933, when he sang Chim-Fen in L'Oracolo; he had created the role in 1905.

Scotti returned to Italy to spend his retirement. He died in Naples in 1936, aged 70.

Recordings and vocal characteristics
Scotti can be heard singing snatches of Scarpia's music in part of a clearly exciting performance of Tosca that was recorded live at the Met on faint and crackly Mapleson Cylinders in 1903. He is partnered by soprano Emma Eames and tenor Emilio De Marchi, with Luigi Mancinelli conducting.

He also made intermittent visits to commercial recording studios from 1902 until the outbreak of hostilities in Europe in 1914. Records which he cut for the British Gramophone and Typewriter Company and the American Victor Talking Machine Company and Columbia Phonograph Company have been reissued on CD, featuring a range of solo arias and some operatic duets and ensembles with Caruso, Marcella Sembrich and Geraldine Farrar and others. These records of Scotti's confirm that he was a stylish, well-trained and aristocratic singer. His voice was not especially large nor resonant; but it had a steady, smooth tone and was accurate in its execution of difficult vocal ornaments.

A striking and extroverted person on stage and off, Scotti was adept at portraying both dramatic and comic characters.

Some notable Scotti roles

Baron Scarpia, Tosca
Chim-Fen, L'Oracolo
Rigoletto, Rigoletto
Iago, Otello
Posa, Don Carlo
Don Giovanni, Don Giovanni
Amonasro, Aida
Dr. Malatesta, Don Pasquale
Belcore, L'elisir d'amore
Falstaff, Falstaff
Marcello, La bohème
Sharpless, Madama Butterfly

References

Further reading
David Ewen, Encyclopedia of the Opera.
John Steane, The Grand Tradition.
Michael Scott, The Record of Singing, Volume 1.
Harold Rosenthal and John Warrack, The Concise Oxford Dictionary of Opera (second edition).
Alan Blyth, liner notes for Antonio Scotti, Pearl compact disc, GEMM CD 9937.
 Jean-Pierre Mouchon, "Le baryton Antonio Scotti" and "Discographie d'Antonio Scotti" in Étude N° 22, April–June 2003, pp. 4–11 (Association internationale de chant lyrique "Titta Ruffo", Marseilles, France).
 Roberto Caamaño: "La Historia del Teatro Colón" (Volume 1)
 Annals of the Metropolitan Opera: The complete chronicle of performances and artists.
  no. 24 Don Giovanni.
 Mario Cánepa Guzmán: La Opera en Chile.
 Edgar de Brito Chaves (jr.): "La ópera en el viejo teatro Lyrico de Río" (in Ayer y Hoy de la Opera, no. 1, Buenos Aires, November 1977)

External links

Scotti singing "Eri tu" from Un Ballo in Maschera on Basso Cantante.
 "Antonio Scotti" in journal Étude n° 22, April–May–June 2003 (see above in bibliography), published by titta-ruffo-international.jimdo.com

Italian operatic baritones
1866 births
1936 deaths
Musicians from Naples